Chaohu East railway station is a railway station in Chaohu, Hefei, Anhui. This station commenced services with Hefei–Fuzhou high-speed railway (part of Beijing–Taipei high-speed rail corridor) on June 28, 2015.

See also
Chaohu railway station

References

Railway stations in China opened in 2015
Railway stations in Anhui